Greenock Lynedoch was a railway station serving Greenock, Inverclyde, Scotland, originally as part of the Greenock and Ayrshire Railway.

History
The station opened on 23 December 1869, as Lynedoch being renamed as Greenock Lynedoch in May 1898.

On 2 February 1959, stopping passenger services from Glasgow and Paisley ceased running beyond Kilmacolm; however, the  boat trains continued running, without stopping until 30 November 1965.

Gallery

References

Notes

Sources 
 
 
 
 
 
 Lynedoch station on navigable OS map

Disused railway stations in Greenock
Railway stations in Great Britain opened in 1869
Railway stations in Great Britain closed in 1959
1869 establishments in Scotland
Former Glasgow and South Western Railway stations